XXI Corps is a strike corps of the Indian Army and is headquartered at Bhopal.

World War I
The XXI Indian Corps was first raised on 12 August 1917 during the World War I, specifically for operations in the Middle East region against the German–Ottoman alliance. The corps was part of the Egyptian Expeditionary Force under Allenby and took active part in the capture of Gaza and Jerusalem from October to December 1917, and against the Turkish Seventh and Eight Armies in 1918. The Corps was disbanded in 1918, at the end of the war.

World War II
The corps was re-raised in Persia on 6 June 1942 as a formation of the Indian Army during World War II. The corps was commanded throughout its existence by Lieutenant General Mosley Mayne and was part of the Tenth Army. The corps, composed of the 8th Indian Infantry Division (Major-General Dudley Russell) and the British 56th Infantry Division (Major-General Eric Miles), was created as part of the Allied buildup of forces in Persia and Iraq to create Persia and Iraq Command in order to prevent a German invasion of the Caucasus. The invasion never occurred and the corps was disbanded on 24 August 1943.

Present

After India's intervention in Sri Lanka, the provisional headquarters (HQ) controlling India's expeditionary force, HQ Indian Peace Keeping Force, became HQ XXI Corps in April 1990 at Chandimandir. Permanent retention of the Corps at Bhopal was authorised on 29 October 1990. It is the only strike corps in the Indian Army’s Pune based Southern Command, the other three being - I Corps, II Corps and XVII Corps. XXI corps functions as  both a strike corps and would also be used if India were to make another large intervention overseas.

It currently consists of:
31 Armored Division (White Tiger Division) headquartered at Jhansi-Babina in Uttar Pradesh, Central India. 94 Armoured Brigade may be part of the division.
36 Infantry Division (Reorganised Army Plains Infantry Division) (Shahbaaz Division) at Sagar. In 2001, the Division Artillery Brigade was at Talbehat, 18 Armoured Brigade at Gwalior, 72 Infantry Brigade at Gwalior, and 115 Infantry Brigade was at Dhana.
54 Infantry Division (Bison Division) headquartered at Hyderabad/Secunderabad. It includes - 
91 Infantry Brigade at Trivandrum, which is an amphibious brigade. 
47 Infantry Brigade
76 Infantry Brigade
 41 Artillery Division (Agnibaaz Division) headquartered at Pune.
Corps Artillery Brigade 
Corps Air Defence Brigade (First To Strike Brigade)
475 Engineering Brigade

List of Commanders

See also 
Indian Peace Keeping Force
72nd Indian Infantry Brigade

References 

021
Military units and formations established in 1990